The Battle of Chino, a skirmish of the Mexican–American War occurred on September 26–27, 1846, during which 24 Americans led by Benjamin D. Wilson, who were hiding in the adobe house of Rancho Santa Ana del Chino, were captured by a group of about 50 Californios.

Background
In late September 1846, as war between Mexico and the United States was declared, about 20 Americans led by Benjamin Davis Wilson assembled at Isaac Williams' Rancho Santa Ana del Chino.  Williams, originally from Pennsylvania, had become a Mexican citizen – a prerequisite for owning land – and married Maria de Jesus Lugo, daughter of Antonio Maria Lugo. The Californios doubted the loyalty of Wilson's men and set out to arrest them.

Battle
Serbulo Varela, Diego Sepulveda and Ramon Carrillo left Los Angeles with about fifty men, while José del Carmen Lugo with another fifteen to twenty men left from San Bernardino to converge upon Rancho del Chino. On the night of September 26, 1846, the adobe ranch house was surrounded by the Californios. At dawn, the following day, gunfire was exchanged resulting in one Californio (Carlos Ballesteros, son of the grantee of Rancho Rosa Castilla) dead with two wounded and three Americans wounded.  When the Californios attempted to set fire to the roof of the house, Wilson surrendered to Varela. This brief engagement became known as the Battle of Chino.

Aftermath
Wilson's men were taken prisoner and marched to Paredon Blanco in Boyle Heights, the main camp of the Californio forces. The prisoners were nearly executed in retaliation for the death of Carlos Ballesteros, the only fatal casualty at Chino, but many were related by marriage to Mexican families, and Varela and others intervened. Later, the prisoners were taken to Rancho Los Cerritos, near present-day Long Beach, where they were detained and ultimately released.

See also
 Battles of the Mexican–American War
 List of conflicts in the United States

References

Chino
1846 in Alta California
1846 in the Mexican-American War
Chino, California
Chino Hills (California)
Pomona Valley
History of San Bernardino County, California
September 1846 events